Phenacovolva lenoreae is a species of sea snail, a marine gastropod mollusc in the family Ovulidae, the ovulids, cowry allies or false cowries. They are found in the oceans surrounding Panama and Ecuador.

Description

Distribution

References

Ovulidae
Gastropods described in 1980